is a Japanese manga series written by Go Nagai and illustrated by Rui Takato. It is part of the Devilman franchise created by Nagai. The manga ran in Akita Shoten's Champion Red from March 2012 to December 2013, with its chapters collected in five tankōbon volumes.

In North America, the manga is licensed for English language release by Seven Seas Entertainment.

Publication
Devilman Grimoire is written by Go Nagai and illustrated by Rui Takato. It was serialized in Akita Shoten's Champion Red from March 19, 2012, to December 19, 2013. Akita Shoten collected its chapters in five tankōbon volumes, released from September 20, 2012, to February 20, 2014.

In North America, Seven Seas Entertainment announced the English language release of the manga in January 2017. The five volumes were published between October 31, 2017, and December 31, 2018.

Volume list

References

Further reading

External links

Devilman
Action anime and manga
Akita Shoten manga
Horror anime and manga
Seinen manga
Seven Seas Entertainment titles
Supernatural anime and manga